Choubepur Kalan is a census town in Kanpur district  in the state of Uttar Pradesh, India.

Demographics
 India census, Choubepur Kalan had a population of 8,352. Males constitute 52% of the population and females 48%. Choubepur Kalan has an average literacy rate of 60%, higher than the national average of 59.5%; with male literacy of 64% and female literacy of 55%. 16% of the population is under 6 years of age.

References

Cities and towns in Kanpur Nagar district